is a Japanese film director, screenwriter, film critic and a professor at Tokyo University of the Arts. Although he has worked in a variety of genres, Kurosawa is best known for his many contributions to the Japanese horror genre, his honorific nicknamed "David Cronenberg of Japan".

Biography
Born in Kobe on July 19, 1955, Kiyoshi Kurosawa, who is not related to director Akira Kurosawa, started making films about his life in high school. After studying at Rikkyo University in Tokyo under the guidance of prominent film critic Shigehiko Hasumi, where he began making 8mm films, Kurosawa began directing commercially in the 1980s, working on pink films and low-budget V-Cinema (direct-to-video) productions such as formula yakuza films. In 1981, his 8mm film Shigarami Gakuen (しがらみ学園) was nominated for the Oshima Prize at the PFF (Pia Film Festival). In 1983, after he worked with Shinji Soumai, he released his first feature film Kandagawa Pervert Wars (1983). He became popular after The Excitement of the Do-Re-Mi-Fa Girl (1985) and The Guard from Underground (1992).

In the early 1990s, Kurosawa won a scholarship to the Sundance Institute by submitting his original screen play Charisma. Then, he was able to study filmmaking in the United States, although he had been directing for nearly ten years professionally.

Kurosawa first achieved international acclaim with his 1997 crime thriller film Cure. A year later, he completed two thrillers back-to-back, Serpent's Path and Eyes of the Spider, both of which shared the same premise (a father taking revenge for his child's murder) and lead actor (Show Aikawa) but spun entirely different stories. In March 1999, the Hong Kong International Film Festival presented his first retrospective, a five-title-program including The Excitement of the Do-re-mi fa Girls, The Guard from Underground, Serpent's Path, Eyes of the Spider, and License to Live. 

Kurosawa followed up Cure with a semi-sequel in 1999 with Charisma, a detective film starring Kōji Yakusho. In 2000, Seance, Kurosawa's adaptation of the novel Seance on a Wet Afternoon by Mark McShane, premiered on Kansai TV. It also starred Yakusho, as well as Jun Fubuki (the two had appeared together in Charisma as well). In 2001, he directed the horror film Pulse. Kurosawa released Bright Future, starring Tadanobu Asano, Joe Odagiri and Tatsuya Fuji, in 2003. He followed this with another digital feature, Doppelganger, later the same year. Both Bright Future and Doppelganger have nominated for the Cannes Film Festivals

In 2005, Kurosawa returned with Loft, his first love story since Seance. Another horror film, Retribution, followed in the next year. With his 2008 film, Tokyo Sonata, Kurosawa was considered to step "out of his usual horror genre and into family drama."

He has written a novelization of his own film Pulse, as well as a history of horror cinema with Makoto Shinozaki.

In September 2012, it was announced that he would direct 1905, a film starring Tony Leung Chiu-Wai, Shota Matsuda and Atsuko Maeda. In February 2013, it was announced that production of the film had been cancelled before filming could start.

Kurosawa directed a 2012 five-part television drama Penance. Beautiful 2013, an anthology film featuring Kurosawa's Beautiful New Bay Area Project, screened at the Hong Kong International Film Festival in 2013.

Kurosawa's next feature film Real, which stars Takeru Sato and Haruka Ayase, was released in 2013. He won the Best Director award at the 8th Rome Film Festival for Seventh Code later that year.

His 2015 film Journey to the Shore was screened in the Un Certain Regard section at the 2015 Cannes Film Festival where he won the prize for Best Director.

In 2016, his thriller Creepy premiered at the 66th Berlin International Film Festival. The film marked Kurosawa's first cinematic return to the horror genre since 2006.

His 2017 film Before We Vanish was screened in the Un Certain Regard category at the Cannes Film Festival.

His 2019 film To the Ends of the Earth was screened as the closing film in the Piazza Grande program of the 72nd Locarno Film Festival.

In 2020, Kurosawa won the Silver Lion for Best Direction at the 77th Venice International Film Festival for his film Wife of a Spy.

Style and influences

Kurosawa's directing style has been compared to those of Stanley Kubrick and Andrei Tarkovsky, though he has never expressly listed those directors as influences.  In an interview, he claimed that Alfred Hitchcock and Yasujirō Ozu contributed to shaping his personal vision of the medium. He has also expressed admiration for American film directors such as Don Siegel, Sam Peckinpah, Robert Aldrich, Richard Fleischer, and Tobe Hooper.

In a 2009 interview with IFC, Kurosawa talked about the reason why he has cast the actor Kōji Yakusho in many of his films: "He has similar values and sensitivities. We’re from the same generation. That’s a big reason why I enjoy working with him on the set."

According to Tim Palmer, Kurosawa's films occupy a peculiar position between the materials of mass genre, on the one hand, and esoteric or intellectual abstraction, on the other. They also clearly engage with issues of environmental critique, given Kurosawa's preference for shooting in decaying open spaces, abandoned (and often condemned) buildings, and in places rife with toxins, pestilence and entropy.

According to the Tokyo Art University where he is a professor, Kurosawa talks about his stye. The interviewer mentions that Kurosawa is also versatile when they talk about Clint Eastwood. Kurosawa said he admires people who can do many things. He says he does not box himself into one style or one theme. When asked what he wants to try next, he answered, "The next thing I want to do is something I have never done. "

In the same article, he mentions that he has seen many films since he was  young, and he knows there are many great films over the world. Those films motivate him to be a better filmmaker; he always asks himself how to make films that are memorable for a long time.

In an article by Tokyo Art University, Kurosawa names film critic Hasumi Shigehiko as a mentor and early influence in his filmmaking career. Much of Hasumi's influence would go on to shape the core of Kurosawa's filmography. Kurosawa met Hasumi in University, where he was one of the few students to finish his course, and credits Hasumi with teaching him that film is worth dedicating your entire life for. Hasumi and Kurosawa believe that every element of the film matters and must be meticulously planned. Kurosawa has also stated that one of his goals as a filmmaker is to share Hasumi's teachings.

Filmography

Feature films
Kandagawa Pervert Wars (1983)
The Excitement of the Do-Re-Mi-Fa Girl (1985)
Sweet Home (1989)
The Guard from Underground (1992)
Cure (1997)
License to Live (1998)
Charisma (1999)
Barren Illusion (1999)
Séance (2001)
Pulse (2001); an American remake was done in 2006.
Bright Future (2003)
Doppelganger (2003)
Kazuo Umezu's Horror Theater: House of Bugs (2005)
Loft (2005)
Retribution (2006)
Tokyo Sonata (2008)
Real (2013)
Seventh Code (2013)
1905 (cancelled)
Journey to the Shore (2015)
Creepy (2016)
Daguerrotype (2016)
Before We Vanish (2017)
Foreboding (2017)
To the Ends of the Earth (Tabi no Owari, Sekai no Hajimari) (2019)
Wife of a Spy: Theatrical Edition (2020)

Short films
Vertigo College (1980)
Ghost Cop (2003)
Beautiful New Bay Area Project (2013)

V-Cinema
Yakuza Taxi (1994)
Men of Rage (1994)
Suit Yourself or Shoot Yourself: The Heist (1995)
Suit Yourself or Shoot Yourself: The Escape (1995)
Door 3 (1996)
Suit Yourself or Shoot Yourself: The Loot (1996)
Suit Yourself or Shoot Yourself: The Reversal (1996)
Suit Yourself or Shoot Yourself: The Nouveau Riche (1996)
Suit Yourself or Shoot Yourself: The Hero (1996)
The Revenge: A Visit from Fate (1997)
The Revenge: A Scar That Never Fades (1997)
Eyes of the Spider (1998)
Serpent's Path (1998)

DVD
Soul Dancing (2004)

Television
Wordholic Prisoner (1990)
Whirlpool of Joy (1992)
Seance (2000)
Matasaburo, the Wind Imp (2003)
Penance (2012)
Foreboding (2017)
Wife of a Spy (2020)
Modern Love Tokyo (2022, episode 5)

Acting Credit 
・The Funeral (1984) - Assistant AD

・The Legend of the Stardust Brothers (1985) - Customer

 Yu Waku Sha (1989) - libralian
 Stranger at Night (1991) - Taxi rider 
 Rinne (2006) - College professor
 Occult - Himself

Music Video 

 MARQUEES - Tongati Musume (1991)
 SOUTAISEIRIRON - FLASHBACK (2016)
 Nogizaka46 - Actually... (2022)

Bibliography

Achievement 
Awards

Honors

References

Further reading

External links

 Notebook Primer: Kiyoshi Kurosawa

1955 births
Living people
Japanese film critics
Japanese film directors
Japanese screenwriters
Japanese horror fiction
Horror film directors
People from Kobe
Rikkyo University alumni
Venice Best Director Silver Lion winners
Recipients of the Medal with Purple Ribbon